The governor of Khabarovsk Krai is the highest official of Khabarovsk Krai, a federal subject of Russia, situated in the Far Eastern region of the country. The governor is elected by direct popular vote for the term of five years.

History of office 
After the August putsch of 1991 in the USSR, the democratic leadership of Russia began to create new executive structures in the regions: Soviet-era ispolkoms (executive committees) were replaced by administrations. On 24 October 1991 president of Russia Boris Yeltsin appointed former first deputy chairman of Khabarovsk Krai ispolkom Viktor Ishayev as Head of Administration of Khabarovsk Krai. From 1 November 2001 the office is styled as Governor of Khabarovsk Krai.

List of officeholders

References 

Politics of Khabarovsk Krai
 
Khabarovsk